Yaylaköy can refer to:

 Yaylaköy, Aşkale
 Yaylaköy, Bala
 Yaylaköy, Dazkırı
 Yaylaköy, Keşan
 Yaylaköy, Kuşadası